The Oasis Valley springsnail, scientific name Pyrgulopsis micrococcus, is a species of minute freshwater snails with an operculum, aquatic gastropod molluscs or micromolluscs in the family Hydrobiidae.

This species is endemic to the United States.  Its natural habitat is rivers. It is threatened by habitat loss.

References

 2006 IUCN Red List of Threatened Species.   Downloaded on 7 August 2007.

Molluscs of the United States
Pyrgulopsis
Gastropods described in 1893
Taxonomy articles created by Polbot